Mount Konocti  is a  volcano in Lake County, California on the south shore of Clear Lake. At , it is the second highest peak in the Clear Lake Volcanic Field, which consists of numerous volcanic domes and cones ranging from 10,000 to 2.1 million years old. Although it is often described as extinct, it is actually classified as High Threat Potential. Clear Lake Volcanic Field's alert level is currently classified as Normal.

Geography 

The volcano is the most visible landmark in Lake County other than the lake.  The mountain is located between the towns of Lakeport and Clearlake. It lies directly south of Soda Bay and Riviera Heights and east of Kelseyville. Konocti Harbor and Soda Bay sit at the base of the mountain. From the summit of Mount Konocti, the taller peaks and ridges around Snow Mountain can be seen to the northeast.

Mount Konocti has five distinctive peaks: Wright Peak, Howard Peak, South Peak, Buckingham Peak and Clark Peak. Wright Peak, Howard Peak, and South Peak make up the main part of the mountain, while Buckingham Peak and Clark Peak are located off to the side.

Benson Ridge lies to the south of Clark Peak and west of South Peak. Buckingham Peak lies north of Howard and Wright Peaks and northeast of Clark Peak. South Peak is directly south of Howard Peak and southwest of Wright Peak. Wright Peak lies east and a little north of Howard Peak.

History 
Mount Konocti probably first erupted some 350,000 years ago and last erupted 11,000 years ago. Mount Konocti has an explosive, eruptive history with devastating lava flows ending about 13,000 years ago that formed the mountains from Clearlake Oaks to Ukiah, all of which now are covered by trees making the ancient flows hard to find.  Clear Lake is much older and is possibly the oldest securely dated lake in North America. Core samples taken by U.S. Geological Survey geologists in 1973 and 1980 have been dated to 480,000 years.

Archaeologists have found evidence that native people, principally Pomo people and Wappo, have inhabited the area around Konocti for as much as 11,000 years. The name "Konocti" is derived from the Pomo "kno", mountain, and "htai", woman.

The mountain is covered with heavy concentrations of chaparral similar to the European maquis shrubland. Oak, Pacific madrone, manzanita, western white pine and other plant species of the California coastal mountains dominate the area. On the northeast slope of Mount Konocti is a steep, heavily forested area known locally as the "Black Forest", because it never gets direct sunshine. The Black Forest contains heavy stands of Douglas fir.

Local people have long known that Konocti is riddled with natural caves. Although most of the natural caves collapsed or were filled in for safety in the early 20th century, persistent local belief holds that Konocti's central magma chamber is a vast, empty vertical cavern, partly filled with Clear Lake water and connecting with the lake via an underground seep. This cavern might be the largest on Earth, though its existence is difficult to prove due to the unstable and eroding structure of the volcano's cone. Heavy vegetation also conceals cave entrances. No accurate map or survey of the caves has been created due to the heavy underbrush and unstable hillsides. The majority of Konocti is owned by private parties, who have discouraged exploration and study of the mountain in recent years. The County of Lake recently purchased 1,520 acres on top of the mountain. As a result, Mt. Konocti County Park opened to the public on September 24, 2011.

Pomo legend has it that around the year 1818, after a long drought, the level of Clear Lake dropped so low that a previously unknown cave on the eastern flank of Konocti was exposed. A group of Pomo men entered the cave, and discovered a vast underground lake, containing "blind fish". Repeated attempts by divers to locate this cave have been unsuccessful.

Although the peak of Konocti was owned privately for a long time, it was acquired by Lake County in 2009. It is now called the Mount Konocti County Park, and is open to the public.

Geological status 
The U.S. Geological Survey classifies the Clear Lake Volcanic Field, of which Mount Konocti is the most prominent volcano, as High Threat Potential.

References

Further reading 
 
  Article about Clear Lake and Mt. Konocti
  Extensive article about the Clear Lake area

External links

 
 
 

Stratovolcanoes of the United States
Mountains of Lake County, California
Volcanoes of California
Native American mythology of California
Locations in Native American mythology